Thousand Pieces of Gold is a 1991 Western film starring Rosalind Chao, Chris Cooper, Dennis Dun and Michael Paul Chan, and is directed by Nancy Kelly. The film is based on a novel of the same name.

Plot
Lalu (Rosalind Chao) is a young Chinese woman who is sold by her impoverished family and transported against her will to the American West in 1880. Upon her arrival in California, she meets Jim (Dennis Dun), a Chinese "wife trader" who sells her to Hong King (Michael Paul Chan), a successful Chinese merchant who lives in an Idaho mining town. The two set off on the long journey to Idaho and eventually strike up a friendship along the way.

When they finally arrive in the rough, isolated town, she is distraught to discover that she is not going to be Hong King's wife. Instead, she is to work in his saloon as his newest prostitute under a new name, "China Polly". She is further dismayed when Jim abruptly disappears, leaving her to fend for herself.

The following night, when Hong King tries to sell her virtue to the highest bidder, Lalu violently refuses to submit to her would-be suitors and successfully avoids becoming a prostitute, thanks in part to the intervention of a kind stranger, Charlie Bemis (Chris Cooper), who turns out to be Hong King's Caucasian partner. She placates a furious Hong King and convinces him to allow her to be his servant and saloon maid in order to repay the cost of her purchase. Hong King agrees to let her buy her freedom for the impossible sum of a thousand pieces of gold.

Polly, as Lalu comes to be known, endures great hardship. At one point, she is sexually assaulted by Hong King. However, she refuses to give up. She works hard and makes friends with the local townspeople. She also grows closer to Charlie, who begins to fall deeply in love with her. Meanwhile, Hong King is beset with financial problems and decides to sell Polly to the highest bidder. In a rare stroke of luck, Charlie wins her in a game of poker. She moves in with him but insists they remain platonic and keep separate quarters.

Jim comes back and wants her to be with him but he then leaves her again when he finds out that she is living with Charlie. The "white demons" begin to run out the Chinese people from their town so it will be a purely white town and the Chinese will stop getting all of the gold.

Polly works in many jobs and saves money to go back to China and her family, but ultimately ends up falling in love with Charlie. She marries him and lives the rest of her life with him in a different area so she will not be harassed by the white demons anymore.

Cast
 Rosalind Chao as Lalu
 Chris Cooper as Charlie
 Michael Paul Chan as Hong King
 Dennis Dun as Jim
 Jimmie F. Skaggs as Jonas
 Will Oldham as Miles
 David Hayward as Ohio
 Beth Broderick as Berthe
 Kim Chen as Li Pong
 Freda Foh Shen as Ah Ling
 Chris Evans as Sailor #2

Production
The original title of the film was Gold Mountain. On a budget of $3 million, principal photography began in May 1989. Filming locations included Virginia City, Montana, Nevada City, Montana, and Ennis, Montana. The sequences set in San Francisco were filmed in Butte, Montana. Production wrapped in July 1989.

Release and reception
Thousand Pieces of Gold was released in theatres in November 1991, two years after it was filmed. It made $717,772 at the box office.

On Rotten Tomatoes, the film holds a rating of 88% from 43 reviews. The consensus summarizes: "Thousand Pieces of Golds technical deficiencies are handily outweighed by sterling work from a 24-karat cast -- and a story that has a fresh perspective on the American Old West."

References

External links
 
 
 
 

1991 films
1991 romantic drama films
1991 Western (genre) films
American independent films
American romantic drama films
American Western (genre) films
Films about Chinese Americans
Chinese-American history
Films about interracial romance
Films based on American novels
Films set in the 19th century
Films set in Idaho
Chinese-language American films
1990s American films